Tarbuck's Luck is a British television variety show which aired on BBC 1. It appeared for one-off episode in 1970, then returned as a full six-part series in 1972. Hosted by Jimmy Tarbuck, who had been signed up by the BBC following his success on ITV's Sunday Night at the London Palladium, it combined a mixture of stand-up comedy, sketches and musical performances.

Guests who appeared on the show included Anita Harris, Lionel Blair, Carolyn Seymour, The Bee Gees, Cilla Black, Carol Raye, Joan Benham, Julia Breck, April Walker, June Whitfield, Yootha Joyce, Miriam Karlin, Patricia Hayes, Lulu, Margaret Nolan, Clodagh Rodgers, Joan Sims, Harry Secombe, Josephine Tewson and Sheila Steafel.

References

Bibliography
 Maxford, Howard . Hammer Complete: The Films, the Personnel, the Company. McFarland, 2018.
 Perry, Christopher . The British Television Pilot Episodes Research Guide 1936-2015. 2015.

External links
 

1970 British television series debuts
1972 British television series endings
1970s British comedy television series
BBC television comedy
English-language television shows